Grandidier's dwarf gecko (Lygodactylus tolampyae) is a species of lizard in the family Gekkonidae. The species is endemic to Madagascar.

Etymology
The specific name, tolampyae, may refer to Ambatolampy, a city in Madagascar. Grandidier gave no explanation.

Habitat

Reproduction
L. tolampyae is oviparous.

References

Further reading
Glaw F, Vences M (2006). A Field Guide to the Amphibians and Reptiles of Madagascar, Third Edition. Cologne, Germany: Vences & Glaw Verlag. 496 pp. .
Grandidier A (1872). "Description de quelques Reptiles nouveaux découverts a Madagascar en 1870 ". Annales des Sciences Naturelles, Cinquième Série [Fifth Series], Zoologie et Paléontologie 15 (20): 6–11. (Hemidactylus tolampyæ, new species, p. 8). (in French).
Kojima Y (2016). "Robbery in the Dark: Nocturnal Foraging of a Madagascan Diurnal Gecko, Lygodactylus tolampyae". Current Herpetology 35 (2): 135–138.
Rösler H (2000). "Kommentierte Liste der rezent, subrezent und fossil bekannten Geckotaxa (Reptilia: Gekkonomorpha)". Gekkota 2: 28–153. {Lygodactylus (Lygodactylus) tolampyae, p. 95}. (in German).

Lygodactylus
Reptiles of Madagascar
Endemic fauna of Madagascar
Taxa named by Alfred Grandidier
Reptiles described in 1872